The R521 is a Regional Route in South Africa.

Route
It is a north-south route. The northern terminus is Pontdrif Border Post with Botswana. From there it runs a short distance before being joined by the R572. These two roads are cosigned for about 60 kilometres before reaching Alldays. From there, the R572 heads west, and the R521 continues south. Two east-west roads, the R523 and then the R522 reach their western termini as it continues southward. The route ends at the  R101 in the city of Polokwane.

References

Regional Routes in Limpopo